This list of triangle topics includes things related to the geometric shape, either abstractly, as in idealizations studied by geometers, or in triangular arrays such as Pascal's triangle or triangular matrices, or concretely in physical space. It does not include metaphors like love triangle in which the word has no reference to the geometric shape.

Geometry

Triangle  
Acute and obtuse triangles  
Altern base  
Altitude (triangle)  
Area bisector of a triangle
Angle bisector of a triangle
Angle bisector theorem  
Apollonius point  
Apollonius' theorem  
Automedian triangle  
Barrow's inequality
Barycentric coordinates (mathematics)
Bernoulli's quadrisection problem  
Brocard circle  
Brocard points  
Brocard triangle  
Carnot's theorem (conics)  
Carnot's theorem (inradius, circumradius)  
Carnot's theorem (perpendiculars)  
Catalogue of Triangle Cubics
Centroid  
Ceva's theorem  
Cevian  
Circumconic and inconic  
Circumscribed circle  
Clawson point  
Cleaver (geometry)  
Congruence (geometry)  
Congruent isoscelizers point  
Contact triangle  
Conway triangle notation  
CPCTC  
Delaunay triangulation  
de Longchamps point  
Desargues' theorem  
Droz-Farny line theorem  
Encyclopedia of Triangle Centers  
Equal incircles theorem  
Equal parallelians point  
Equidissection  
Equilateral triangle  
Euler's line  
Euler's theorem in geometry  
Erdős–Mordell inequality
Exeter point  
Exterior angle theorem  
Fagnano's problem  
Fermat point  
Fermat's right triangle theorem  
Fuhrmann circle  
Fuhrmann triangle  
Geometric mean theorem  
GEOS circle  
Gergonne point  
Golden triangle (mathematics)  
Gossard perspector
Hadley's theorem  
Hadwiger–Finsler inequality  
Heilbronn triangle problem
Heptagonal triangle
Heronian triangle  
Heron's formula  
Hofstadter points  
Hyperbolic triangle (non-Euclidean geometry)  
Hypotenuse  
Incircle and excircles of a triangle  
Inellipse  
Integer triangle  
Isodynamic point  
Isogonal conjugate  
Isoperimetric point  
Isosceles triangle  
Isosceles triangle theorem  
Isotomic conjugate  
Isotomic lines  
Jacobi point  
Japanese theorem for concyclic polygons
Johnson circles  
Kepler triangle  
Kobon triangle problem  
Kosnita's theorem  
Leg (geometry)  
Lemoine's problem   
Lester's theorem  
List of triangle inequalities  
Mandart inellipse  
Maxwell's theorem (geometry)  
Medial triangle  
Median (geometry)  
Menelaus' theorem  
Miquel's theorem  
Mittenpunkt  
Modern triangle geometry
Monsky's theorem  
Morley centers  
Morley triangle  
Morley's trisector theorem  
Musselman's theorem  
Nagel point  
Napoleon points  
Napoleon's theorem  
Nine-point circle  
Nine-point hyperbola  
One-seventh area triangle  
Orthocenter  
Orthocentric system  
Orthocentroidal circle  
Orthopole  
Pappus' area theorem  
Parry point  
Pedal triangle  
Perimeter bisector of a triangle
Perpendicular bisectors of triangle sides
Polar circle (geometry)
Pompeiu's theorem  
Pons asinorum  
Pythagorean theorem  
 Inverse Pythagorean theorem  
Reuleaux triangle  
Regiomontanus  
Regiomontanus' angle maximization problem  
Reuschle's theorem  
Right triangle  
Routh's theorem  
Scalene triangle  
Schwarz triangle  
Schiffler's theorem  
Sierpinski triangle  (fractal geometry)  
Similarity (geometry)  
Similarity system of triangles  
Simson line  
Special right triangles  
Spieker center  
Spieker circle  
Spiral of Theodorus  
Splitter (geometry)  
Steiner circumellipse
Steiner inellipse  
Steiner–Lehmus theorem  
Stewart's theorem  
Steiner point  
Symmedian  
Tangential triangle
Tarry point  
Ternary plot  
Thales' theorem  
Thomson cubic  
Triangle center  
Triangle conic
Triangle group  
Triangle inequality  
Triangular bipyramid
Triangular prism
Triangular pyramid
Triangular tiling
Triangulation
Trilinear coordinates
Trilinear polarity
Trisected perimeter point  
Viviani's theorem  
Wernau points  
Yff center of congruence

Trigonometry
Differentiation of trigonometric functions
Exact trigonometric constants
History of trigonometry
Inverse trigonometric functions
Law of cosines  
Law of cotangents
Law of sines  
Law of tangents  
List of integrals of inverse trigonometric functions
List of integrals of trigonometric functions
List of trigonometric identities
Mollweide's formula  
Outline of trigonometry
Rational trigonometry  
Sine
Solution of triangles  
Spherical trigonometry  
Trigonometric functions  
Trigonometric substitution
Trigonometric tables
Trigonometry  
Uses of trigonometry

Applied mathematics 

 De Finetti diagram
 Triangle mesh
 Nonobtuse mesh

Resources 

 Encyclopedia of Triangle Centers
 Pythagorean Triangles
 The Secrets of Triangles

Algebra

Triangular matrix
(2,3,7) triangle group

Number theory

Triangular arrays of numbers 

 Bell numbers
 Boustrophedon transform
 Eulerian number
 Floyd's triangle
 Lozanić's triangle
 Narayana number
 Pascal's triangle
 Rencontres numbers
 Romberg's method
 Stirling numbers of the first kind
 Stirling numbers of the second kind
 Triangular number
 Triangular pyramidal number

The (incomplete) Bell polynomials from a triangular array of polynomials (see also Polynomial sequence).

Integers in triangle geometry 

Heronian triangle
Integer triangle
Pythagorean triple
Eisenstein triple

Geography

Bermuda Triangle
Historic Triangle
Lithium Triangle
Parliamentary Triangle, Canberra
Research Triangle
Sunni Triangle
Triangular trade

Anatomy

Submandibular triangle
Triangle choke
Arm triangle choke
Submental triangle
Carotid triangle
Clavipectoral triangle
Inguinal triangle
Codman triangle

Artifacts

Black triangle
Triangle (musical instrument)
Triangular prism (optics)
Triquetra

Symbols
Eye of Providence
Valknut
Shield of the Trinity

 Topics
 Topics
Outlines of mathematics and logic
Wikipedia outlines
Lists of topics
Lists of shapes